Virtual Programming is a video game publisher for OS X and Linux.

Virtual Programming has worked with publishers such as Square Enix, 2K Games, Epic, Codemasters, Techland and CD Projekt Red. Virtual Programming sources games from these publishers for porting to and publishing on the Mac and Linux platforms.

The company's macOS titles are available in the Mac App Store and via their own distribution channel, deliver2mac. In May 2014, they released their first Linux port, Witcher 2, using a proprietary technology called eON.

Games

Mac 

 Airline Tycoon Deluxe
 Ankh 2 Heart of Osiris
 ATV Quad Kings
 Battle vs. Chess
 Birdie Shoot 2
 Blitzkrieg
 Blitzkrieg Anthology
 Call of Duty 2
 Call of Duty 4: Modern Warfare
 Capitalism 2
 Commander: Conquest of the Americas
 Crusader Kings Complete
 Crusader Kings 2
 Cultures Northlands
 DiRT Showdown
 Earth 2140
 Europa Universalis 2
 Europa Universalis III Chronicles
 Europa Universalis Rome Gold
 Falcon 4.0: Allied Force
 FlatOut 2
 Hearts of Iron 2 Complete
 Hearts of Iron 3: For the Motherland
 Hearts of Iron 3: Their Finest Hour
 Jack Keane
 Jade Rousseau: The Secret Revelations
 The Journey Down
 King Arthur II
 King Arthur 2 - Dead Legions
 Knights and Merchants
 Lemure
 March of the Eagles
 Marine Park Empire
 Patrician IV
 Reel Deal Card Games 2011
 Reel Deal Casino Gold Rush
 Reel Deal Casino High Roller
 Reel Deal Casino Imperial Fortune
 Reel Deal Casino Millionaire's Club
 Reel Deal Slots Blackbeard's Revenge
 Reel Deal Slots Ghost Town
 Reel Deal Slots Mysteries of Cleopatra
 Reel Deal Slots Mystic Forest
 Reel Deal Slots Treasures of the Far East
 Restaurant Empire 2
 Pipemania
 Pirates of Black Cove
 Restaurant Empire 2
 Robin Hood - The Legend of Sherwood
 Sengoku
 Spec Ops: The Line
 Stronghold 3
 Summer Games
 Supreme Ruler Cold War
 Two Worlds Pirates of the Flying Fortress
 Two Worlds II
 Two Worlds II Castle Defense
 Velvet Assassin
 Victoria 2
 Victoria 2: A House Divided
 Victoria 2 Heart of Darkness
 Victoria Complete
 The Witcher 2: Assassins of Kings
 World Golf Challenge
 Winter Games

Linux 

 BioShock Infinite
 Dirt: Showdown
 Spec Ops: The Line
 Saints Row 2
 Saints Row: The Third
 Saints Row IV
 Stronghold 3
 The Witcher 2: Assassins of Kings

References

External links 

Video game companies established in 2000
Linux companies
Linux game porters
Macintosh software companies
Video game companies of the United Kingdom
Video game development companies
British companies established in 2000